Mansour Gholami (born 1953 in Qorve) is an Iranian professor, politician and former Minister of Science, a position he held from 2017 to 2021. He was Chancellor of Bu-Ali Sina University in two terms, first from 1997 until 2004 and the second from 2014 until 2017.

References 

1953 births
Living people
Ministers of science of Iran
Islamic Association of University Instructors politicians